Dmalloc is a C memory debugger library written by Gray Watson to assist programmers in finding a variety of dynamic memory allocation mistakes. It replaces parts (such as malloc) of the C standard library provided by the operating system or compiler with its own versions, which produce information intended to help the programmer detect problematic code.

Dmalloc can find memory leaks, off-by-one errors, and usage of invalid addresses in some library functions calls.

See also
Memory debugger

External links
 Dmalloc Official web site
 Dmalloc Github web site
 Memory Leak Detection in Embedded Systems
 Using Dmalloc With the Solaris OS and Sun Studio Compilers

Memory management software
Free memory debuggers